In computer programming, a green thread is a thread that is scheduled by a runtime library or virtual machine (VM) instead of natively by the underlying operating system (OS). Green threads emulate multithreaded environments without relying on any native OS abilities, and they are managed in user space instead of kernel space, enabling them to work in environments that do not have native thread support.

Etymology
Green threads refers to the name of the original thread library for the programming language Java (that was released in version 1.1 and then Green threads were abandoned in version 1.3 to native threads). It was designed by The Green Team at Sun Microsystems.

History 
Green threads were briefly available in Java between 1997 and 2000

Green threads share a single operating system thread through co-operative concurrency and can therefore not achieve parallelism performance gains like operating system threads. The main benefit of coroutines and green threads is ease of implementation

Performance

On a multi-core processor, native thread implementations can automatically assign work to multiple processors, whereas green thread implementations normally cannot. Green threads can be started much faster on some VMs. On uniprocessor computers, however, the most efficient model has not yet been clearly determined.

Benchmarks on computers running the Linux kernel version 2.2 (released in 1999) have shown that:
 Green threads significantly outperform Linux native threads on thread activation and synchronization.
 Linux native threads have slightly better performance on input/output (I/O) and context switching operations.

When a green thread executes a blocking system call, not only is that thread blocked, but all of the threads within the process are blocked. To avoid that problem, green threads must use asynchronous I/O operations, although the increased complexity on the user side can be reduced if the virtual machine implementing the green threads spawns specific I/O processes (hidden to the user) for each I/O operation.

There are also mechanisms which allow use of native threads and reduce the overhead of thread activation and synchronization:
 Thread pools reduce the cost of spawning a new thread by reusing a limited number of threads.
 Languages which use virtual machines and native threads can use escape analysis to avoid synchronizing blocks of code when unneeded.

Green threads in the Java virtual machine

Original implementation: Green Threads
In Java 1.1, green threads were the only threading model used by the Java virtual machine (JVM), at least on Solaris. As green threads have some limitations compared to native threads, subsequent Java versions dropped them in favor of native threads.

An exception to this is the Squawk virtual machine, which is a mixture between an operating system for low-power devices and a Java virtual machine. It uses green threads to minimize the use of native code, and to support migrating its isolates.

Kilim and Quasar
are open-source projects which implement green threads on later versions of the JVM by modifying the Java bytecode produced by the Java compiler (Quasar also supports Kotlin and Clojure).

Green threads in other languages
There are some other programming languages that implement equivalents of green threads instead of native threads. Examples:
 Chicken Scheme uses lightweight user-level threads based on first-class continuations
 .NET uses green threads via tasks
 Common Lisp
 CPython with greenlet, eventlet and gevent, PyPy
 Crystal offers fibers
 D offers fibers, used for asynchronous I/O
 Dyalog APL terms them threads
 Erlang
 Go
 Haskell
 Julia uses green threads for its Tasks.
 Limbo
 Lua uses coroutines for concurrency. Lua 5.2 also offers true C coroutine semantics through the functions lua_yieldk, lua_callk, and lua_pcallk. The CoCo extension allows true C coroutine semantics for Lua 5.1.
 Nim provides asynchronous I/O and coroutines
 OCaml, since version 5.0, supports green threads through the Domainslib.Task module
 occam, which prefers the term process instead of thread due to its origins in communicating sequential processes
 Perl supports green threads through coroutines
 PHP supports green threads through fibers and coroutines
 Ruby before version 1.9
 Racket (native threads are also available through Places)
 Rust runs system threads natively; it supports green threads through third-party libraries like Tokio.
 SML/NJ's implementation of Concurrent ML
 Smalltalk (most dialects: Squeak, VisualWorks, GNU Smalltalk, etc.)
 Stackless Python supports either preemptive multitasking or cooperative multitasking through microthreads (termed tasklets).
 Tcl has coroutines and an event loop

The Erlang virtual machine has what might be called green processes – they are like operating system processes (they do not share state like threads do) but are implemented within the Erlang Run Time System (erts). These are sometimes termed green threads, but have significant differences from standard green threads.

In the case of GHC Haskell, a context switch occurs at the first allocation after a configurable timeout. GHC threads are also potentially run on one or more OS threads during their lifetime (there is a many-to-many relationship between GHC threads and OS threads), allowing for parallelism on symmetric multiprocessing machines, while not creating more costly OS threads than needed to run on the available number of cores.

occam is unusual in this list because its original implementation was made for the Transputer, and hence no virtual machine was needed. Later ports to other processors have introduced a virtual machine modeled on the design of the Transputer, an effective choice because of the low overheads involved.

Most Smalltalk virtual machines do not count evaluation steps; however, the VM can still preempt the executing thread on external signals (such as expiring timers, or I/O becoming available). Usually round-robin scheduling is used so that a high-priority process that wakes up regularly will effectively implement time-sharing preemption:
 [
    [(Delay forMilliseconds: 50) wait] repeat
 ] forkAt: Processor highIOPriority
Other implementations, e.g., QKS Smalltalk, are always time-sharing. Unlike most green thread implementations, QKS also supports preventing priority inversion.

See also
 Async/await
 Light-weight process
 Coroutine
 Java virtual machine
 Global interpreter lock
 Fiber (computer science)
 GNU Portable Threads
 Protothreads

References

External links
 "Four for the ages", JavaWorld article about Green threads
 Green threads on Java threads FAQ

Threads (computing)
Java platform